Colin Whitcomb Clark (born 1931) is a Professor Emeritus of Mathematics at The University of British Columbia. Clark specializes in behavioral ecology and the economics of natural resources, specifically, in the management of commercial fisheries. Clark was named a Fellow of the International Institute of Fisheries Economics & Trade (IIFET) in 2016 for his contributions to bioeconomics. Clark's impact upon fisheries economics through his scholarly work is encapsulated in Mathematical Bioeconomics: The Mathematics of Conservation, which is considered to be a classic contribution in environmental economic theory.

Honours and awards
1997 Elected Fellow of the Royal Society

Books 
 Math Overboard! (Basic Math for Adults): Part 2. 2013. Dog Ear Publishing.
 Math Overboard! (Basic Math for Adults): Part 1. 2012. Dog Ear Publishing.
 Mathematical Bioeconomics: The Mathematics of Conservation. 3rd Edition. 2010. Wiley Interscience (New York, NY).
 The Worldwide Crisis in Fisheries: Economic Models and Human Behaviour. 2006. Cambridge University Press (Cambridge, UK; New York, NY).
 Dynamic State Variable Models in Ecology: Methods and Applications (with Marc Mangel). 2000. Oxford University Press (Oxford, UK: New York, NY).
 Dynamic Models in Behavioral Ecology (with Marc Mangel). 1988. Princeton University Press (Princeton, NJ).
 Natural Resource Economics: Notes and Problems (with Jon Conrad). 1997. Cambridge University Press (Cambridge, UK: New York, NY).

References 

1931 births
Living people
Academic staff of the University of British Columbia Faculty of Science
Behavioral ecology
Canadian ecologists
Canadian mathematicians
Mathematical ecologists
Fellows of the Royal Society